Rolf Gerber (born 25 July 1930) was a Swiss bobsledder who competed in the mid-1950s. He won a silver medal in the four-man event at the 1955 FIBT World Championships in St. Moritz. Gerber also finished fourth in the four-man event at the 1956 Winter Olympics in Cortina d'Ampezzo.

References
Bobsleigh four-man world championship medalists since 1930
Wallenchinsky, David. (1984). "Bobsled: Four-man". In The Complete Book of the Olympics: 1896-1980. New York: Penguin Books. p. 561.
 

1930 births
Possibly living people
Bobsledders at the 1956 Winter Olympics
Swiss male bobsledders
Olympic bobsledders of Switzerland
20th-century Swiss people